Call signs in Japan are unique identifiers for telecommunications and broadcasting.

Call sign blocks for telecommunication
The International Telecommunication Union has assigned Japan the following call sign blocks for all radio communication, broadcasting or transmission:

While not directly related to call signs, the International Telecommunication Union (ITU) further has divided all countries assigned amateur radio prefixes into three regions; Japan is located in ITU Region 3.  The ITU and CQ Magazine have divided these regions into zones.  The main islands of Japan are in ITU Zone 45 and CQ Zone 25.  Outlying islands can have differing zones, see the following table:

Amateur radio callsign areas

In Japan, amateur radio (ham radio) licensing of operators is regulated by the Ministry of Internal Affairs and Communications (MIC, 総務省 Sōmu-shō) with the Japan Amateur Radio League (JARL, 日本アマチュア無線連盟) acting as a national amateur radio organization.  The IARU cites a year 2000 count of licensed ham operators at 1,296,059, out of a total population of 126,925,843. The MIC publishes data showing 446,602 licensed stations as of October 2011.

Amateur radio call signs are assigned based on the area of residence, with the country divided into 10 areas as follows (listed from Northeast to Southwest):

Outlying regions use a subset of the allocated prefixes:

Most call signs are of the "2x3" format (2 letters, a digit, and 3 letters). There are some special-event and "old-timer" calls that are "2x2", and a small number of "2x1" calls for special events and other special purposes.

References

External links
 Enigma of Japanese Call Sign System

Japan
Communications in Japan
Mass media in Japan